was a Japanese actor. He attended Waseda University, but withdrew before completing his degree and joined the Haiyuza Theatre Company. In 1959, Nakatani won Elan d'or Award for Newcomer of the Year.  Nakatani was well known for his role as Ninja Kazaguruma no Yahichi in the jidaigeki drama Mito Kōmon.

Selected filmography

Film

 Shujinsen (1956)
 Rodan (1956) - Senkichi, miner, killed by Meganuron (uncredited)
 Sanjûrokunin no jôkyaku (1957) - Yamaoka
 Kampai! Miai kekkon (1958)
 Lucky Dragon No. 5 (1959) - Squad Leader
 The Last Gunfight (1960) - Tsugiseki Mochizuki
 Seppun dorobô (1960)
 Aoi yaju (1960) - Goda
 Fundoshi isha (1960) - Genta
 Dokuritsu gurentai nishi-e (1960)
 Kane-dukuri taikô-ki (1960) - Yûji Hirayama
 Ankokugai no dankon (1961) - Shizuo Komatsu
 Nasake muyo no wana (1961) - Izaki, police detective
 Kaoyaku akatsukini shisu (1961)
 Atomic no obon: Surimasuwayo no maki (1961)
 Yojimbo (1961) - First Samurai
 Atomic no obon, onna oyabuntaiketsu no maki (1961)
 Ankokugai gekimetsu meirei (1961) - Kamiya
 Josei jishin (1962) - Shinkichi Sakagami
 Dobunezumi sakusen (1962)
 Harakiri (1962) - Hayato Yazaki
 Yama-neko sakusen (1962)
 Ankokugai no kiba (1962)
 Attack Squadron! (1963)
 Sengoku yarô (1963)
 Otoko no monshô (1963)
 Hiken (1963)
 Zokû otoko no monshô (1963)
 Aa bakudan (1964) - Yasaburo Yatou
 Nemuri Kyôshirô: Joyôken (1964) - Takebe
 Kwaidan (1964) - (segment "Miminashi Hôichi no hanashi")
 Yuhi no okâ (1964)
 Otoko no monshô - fuun futatsu ryu (1964)
 Otoko no monsho: hana to nagadosu (1964)
 Kuroi kaikyo (1964) - Tetsuji Onuki
 Zoku Abashiri bangaichi (1965)
 Abashiri bangaichi: Bôkyô hen (1965)
 Supai (1965)
 Gohiki no shinshi (1966)
 Dai-bosatsu tōge (1966) - Bunnojo Utsuki
 Nemuri Kyôshirô: Tajôken (1966)
 Otokonokao wa rirekisho (1966)
 The Betrayal (1966)
 Heitai yakuza datsugoku (1966)
 Nihon ânkokugai (1966)
 'Kûhaku no kiten' yori: Onna wa fukushû suru (1966) - Detective Takarai
 Tonogata goyôjin (1966)
 Futeki na âitsu (1966)
 Samurai Wolf II (1967) - Ikkaku
 Japan's Longest Day (1967) - First Lieutnenant Kuroda
 Aru koroshiya no kagi (1967)
 Abashiri bangaichi: Fubuki no tôsô (1967) - Nankai
 Taiketsu (1967)
 Teppô denraiki (1968) - Sakuji
 Isoroku (1968) - (uncredited)
 Ama-kuzure (1968) - Goro
 The Human Bullet (1968)
 Kanto onna yakuza (1968)
 Outlaw:Black Dagger (1968)
  (1969)
 Hitokiri (1969)
 Red Lion (1969) - Narrator (voice)
 Tengu-tô (1969) - Chôgorô
 Shinsengumi (1969) - Moribe Tani
 Gonin no Shôkin Kasegi (1969) - Mondo Shibaike
 Kanto onna do konjo (1969)
 Nemuri Kyōshirō manji giri (1969)
 Fuji sanchō (1970)
  (1970) - Sano (uncredited)
 Wakamono no hata (1970)
 Koroshiya ninbetsucho (1970)
 Gokuaku bozu nenbutsu sandangiri (1970)
 Deka monogatari (1971)
 Zubekô banchô: Zange no neuchi mo nai (1971) - Mari's poor husband
 Kitsune no kureta akanbô (1971) - Ushigoro Umakata
 Battle of Okinawa (1971)
 Inn of Evil (1971) - Hacchôbori officer, Okajima
 Lone Wolf and Cub: Baby Cart to Hades (1972) - Yagyu Samurai
 Shinobu-ito (1973)
 The Homeless (1974)
 Orenochi wa Taninnochi (1974) - Itami
 Sandakan No. 8 (1974) - Yamamoto
 New Battles Without Honor and Humanity (1974) - Nanba
 The Fossil (1975) - Taisuke, Tajihei's brother
 Tokkan (1975) - Narrator
 Kinkanshoku (1975)
 Bodo shimane keimusho (1975)
 Zoku ningen kakumei (1976)
 Shin joshû Sasori: 701-gô (1976) - Dietman Miura
 Fumō Chitai (1976)
 Hokuriku Proxy War (1977)
 Sugata Sanshiro (1977)
 Shogun's Samurai (1978) - Gyobu Amano (Masterless Samurai)
 Dainamaito don don (1978) - Yuichi
 Blue Christmas (1978)
 Mito Kōmon (1978)
  (1979)
 Nihon no Fixer (1979)
 Nichiren (1979)
 Imperial Navy (1981)
 Willful Murder (1981) - Toyama
 Jirô monogatari (1987)
 Rainbow Kids (1991) - President of Wakayama TV (final film role)

Television
 Mito Kōmon (1969-1999) - Kazaguruma no Yahichi
 Tasukenin Hashiru (1973) - Tsuji Hainai
 Onihei Hankachō (1975)
 Edo o Kiru (1975–1976) - Chiba Shūsaku

References

20th-century Japanese male actors
1930 births
2004 deaths